Emin Ahmadov (born 6 October 1986, Baku) is an Azerbaijani wrestler. He won the bronze medal at the 2012 Summer Olympics in the Greco-Roman men's 74 kg event.  Along the way he beat Neven Zugaj and Zurab Datunashvili, before losing to Arsen Julfalakyan in the semi-final.  Because Julfalakyan reached the final, Ahmadov was a participant in the bronze medal repechage, where he beat Aliaksandr Kikiniou in his bronze medal match.

References

External links
 

1986 births
Living people
Olympic wrestlers of Azerbaijan
Wrestlers at the 2012 Summer Olympics
Olympic bronze medalists for Azerbaijan
Olympic medalists in wrestling
Medalists at the 2012 Summer Olympics
Azerbaijani male sport wrestlers
Sportspeople from Baku
21st-century Azerbaijani people